Pitcairnia orchidifolia is a plant species in the genus Pitcairnia. This species is endemic to Venezuela.

References

orchidifolia
Flora of Venezuela